Sternberger is a surname. Notable people with the surname include:
Dolf Sternberger (1907–1989), German philosopher
Estelle Sternberger (1886–1971), American activist, writer and broadcaster
Jace Sternberger (born 1997), American football player
Jakob Marzel Sternberger (1750–1822), Bohemian German mayor
Jacob Sternberger, grandson of Jakob Marzel Sternberger
Lionel Sternberger, credited by some with producing the first cheeseburger
Marcel Sternberger (1899–1956), Hungarian-American portrait photographer

See also
Sternberger Seenlandschaft, Amt in the district of Parchim, Mecklenburg-Vorpommern
Großer Sternberger See, lake in Mecklenburg-Vorpommern, Germany

German-language surnames
Jewish surnames